This article contains the results of the Republic of Ireland national football team during the 1950s. Between 1936 and 1954 the Football Association of Ireland referred to their team as Ireland. After a FIFA ruling they became the Republic of Ireland in 1954.

1954

1955

1956

1957

1958

1959

See also
 Ireland national football team (FAI) results
 Republic of Ireland national football team results (1960–1979)

References

1950s
1954–55 in Republic of Ireland association football
1955–56 in Republic of Ireland association football
1956–57 in Republic of Ireland association football
1957–58 in Republic of Ireland association football
1958–59 in Republic of Ireland association football
1959–60 in Republic of Ireland association football